Marthinus Wilhelminus S. Theunissen (13 May 1911 – July 1983) was a South African athlete who competed in the 1936 Summer Olympics. He was born in Standerton.

In 1936 he was eliminated in the semi-finals of the 200 metres event and in the quarter-finals of the 100 metres competition. He was also a member of the South African team which was eliminated in the first round of the 4x100 metre relay contest. At the 1934 Empire Games he won the silver medal in the 100 yards event as well as in the 220 yards competition.

External links
Marthinus Theunissen's profile at Sports Reference.com

1911 births
1983 deaths
People from Standerton
Afrikaner people
South African male sprinters
Olympic athletes of South Africa
Athletes (track and field) at the 1936 Summer Olympics
Athletes (track and field) at the 1934 British Empire Games
Commonwealth Games silver medallists for South Africa
Commonwealth Games medallists in athletics
Medallists at the 1934 British Empire Games